Kevin Holtz (born 6 March 1993) is a Luxembourgian footballer who plays as a midfielder for Progrès Niederkorn and the Luxembourg national team.

Club career
On 18 December 2021, he was loaned to FC Atert Bissen for 6 months.

International career
Holtz made his international debut for Luxembourg on 2 June 2019 in a friendly match against Madagascar, which finished as a 3–3 draw.

Personal life
Holtz's father, Luc, is a former Luxembourg international footballer and the manager of the Luxembourg national team.

Career statistics

International

References

External links
 
 
 

1993 births
Living people
Luxembourgian footballers
Luxembourg under-21 international footballers
Luxembourg international footballers
Association football midfielders
FC Etzella Ettelbruck players
FC Progrès Niederkorn players
Luxembourg National Division players
Luxembourg Division of Honour players